Colección Privada: Grandes Éxitos & Remixes is the second greatest hits compilation by Spanish recording artist Mónica Naranjo released on 27 April 2005. The compilation was released in two different formats, the 2CD+DVD edition, containing the greatest hits album with a remixes album and a bonus disc with music videos including the previously unreleased video "Perra Enamorada", and the 3CD+DVD Lujo-Box Set containing her Tour Minage, filmed on 10 October 2000 in Palacio de los Deportes, in Madrid, Spain. The album includes one new track, "Enamorada de Tí", which was released on 18 April 2005.

Track listing

Release history

Charts

References

Mónica Naranjo compilation albums
2005 compilation albums
2005 video albums
Live video albums
Sony Music compilation albums
Sony Music video albums
Columbia Records compilation albums
Locomotive Music compilation albums
Rykodisc video albums
Music video compilation albums